Cote is a suburb of Worthing, in the borough of Worthing in West Sussex, England. It lies just off the A27 road 2.8 miles (4.6 km) northwest of the town centre.

References

External links

Suburbs of Worthing